Paphinia neudeckeri is a species of orchid found from Colombia to Ecuador.

Taxonomy 
The classification of this orchid species was published by Rudolf Jenny in Die Orchidee.

References

External links 
 
 
  Meyers Conservatory: Paphinia neudeckerii.

neudeckeri
Orchids of Colombia
Orchids of Ecuador